In meteorology, the equilibrium level (EL), or level of neutral buoyancy (LNB), or limit of convection (LOC), is the height at which a rising parcel of air is at the same temperature as its environment. 

This means that unstable air is now stable when it reaches the equilibrium level and convection stops. This level is often near the tropopause and can be indicated as near where the anvil of a thunderstorm because it is where the thunderstorm updraft is finally cut off, except in the case of overshooting tops where it continues rising to the maximum parcel level (MPL) due to momentum. More precisely, the cumulonimbus will stop rising around a few kilometres prior to reaching the level of neutral buoyancy and on average anvil glaciation occurs at a higher altitude over land than over sea (despite little difference in LNB from land to sea).

See also 
 Atmospheric thermodynamics
 Convective instability
 Level of free convection
 Lifted condensation level

References

External links 
 The Difference Between the Equilibrium Level and Maximum Parcel Level
 Identity of Storm Features

Severe weather and convection
Atmospheric thermodynamics
Buoyancy